Patrick Gilmar Sequeira Mejías (born 1 March 1999) is a Costa Rican professional footballer who plays as a goalkeeper for Spanish club CD Lugo and the Costa Rica national team.

Club career 
Born in Limón, Sequeira was promoted to the first team of Deportivo Saprissa in June 2016. In August 2017, after being only a third-choice, he moved abroad and signed a two-year loan deal with Spanish side Real Unión.

Sequeira made his senior debut for Real Unión on 29 October 2017, in a 3–0 Segunda División B away loss against CD Tudelano. On 16 July 2019, after acting mainly as a backup, he signed a permanent two-year contract.

On 8 September 2020, Sequeira moved to RC Celta de Vigo on loan for one year, being initially assigned to the reserves in Segunda División B. Upon returning, he featured rarely for Real Unión in Primera División RFEF.

On 4 July 2022, Sequeira agreed to a three-year deal with Segunda División side CD Lugo.

International career 
Sequeira was part of the squad at the 2021 CONCACAF Gold Cup, but did not play any match. Originally set to make his debut in a group stage match against Jamaica, he suffered an ankle injury moments before the match and was replaced by Leonel Moreira.

His debut came during a friendly match against South Korea in November 2022, when Sequeira came in as a substitute for Joel Campbell as Esteban Alvarado received a red card. Sequeira's first instant of action as a goalkeeper for Costa Rica was also his first goal conceded, as Alvarado's red card also meant a close free kick eventually scored by Son Heung-min.

References

External links

1999 births
Living people
Costa Rican footballers
Costa Rica youth international footballers
Association football goalkeepers
People from Limón Province
Real Unión footballers
Celta de Vigo B players
CD Lugo players
Segunda División B players
Primera Federación players
Costa Rican expatriate footballers
Costa Rican expatriate sportspeople in Spain
Expatriate footballers in Spain
2022 FIFA World Cup players